Volver (meaning "to go back") is a 2006 Spanish comedy-drama film written and directed by Pedro Almodóvar. The film features an ensemble cast that includes Penélope Cruz, Carmen Maura, Lola Dueñas, Blanca Portillo, Yohana Cobo, and Chus Lampreave. Revolving around an eccentric family of women from a wind-swept region south of Madrid, Cruz stars as Raimunda, a working-class woman forced to go to great lengths to protect her 14-year-old daughter Paula. To top off the family crisis, her mother Irene returns from the dead to tie up loose ends.

The plot originates in Almodóvar's earlier film The Flower of My Secret (1995), where it features as a novel which is rejected for publication but is stolen to form the screenplay of a film named The Freezer. Drawing inspiration from the Italian neorealism of the late 1940s to early 1950s and the work of pioneering directors such as Federico Fellini, Luchino Visconti, and Pier Paolo Pasolini, Volver addresses themes like sexual abuse, loneliness and death, mixing the genres of farce, tragedy, melodrama, and magic realism. Set in the La Mancha region, Almodóvar's place of birth, the filmmaker cited his upbringing as a major influence on many aspects of the plot and the characters.

Volver premiered at the 2006 Cannes Film Festival, where it competed for the Palme d'Or. It received critical acclaim and ultimately won two awards at the festival, for Best Actress (shared by the six main actresses) and Best Screenplay. The film's Spanish premiere was held on 10 March 2006 in Puertollano, where the filming had taken place. Cruz was nominated for the 2006 Academy Award for Best Actress, making her the first Spanish woman ever to be nominated in that category.

Plot
Raimunda (Penélope Cruz) and Sole (Lola Dueñas) are sisters who grew up in Alcanfor de las Infantas, a small village in La Mancha, but now both live in Madrid. Their parents had died in a fire three years before.

Raimunda and her daughter Paula (Yohana Cobo) live with Paula's father Paco (Antonio de la Torre). When he attempts to rape Paula, claiming that he is not really her father, Paula stabs him to death in self-defense. Raimunda hides the corpse in the deep-freezer of a nearby restaurant with an absent owner, Emilio (Carlos Blanco). When members of a film crew happen upon the restaurant, Raimunda strikes a deal to cater for them, and finds herself back in the restaurant business.

Meanwhile, Sole returns for the funeral of her elderly and dementia-stricken Aunt Paula (Chus Lampreave). Aunt Paula's neighbour Agustina (Blanca Portillo) confesses to Sole that she has heard Paula talking to the ghost of their mother Irene (Carmen Maura). Sole encounters her mother's ghost herself, and when she returns to Madrid, she discovers that the ghost has stowed away in the trunk of her car. Sole agrees to let Irene stay with her and assist her with clients for her illicit hair salon, which she operates out of her apartment. Irene agrees to pose as a Russian immigrant who doesn't speak any Spanish. Irene questions why Raimunda hates her and is fearful of revealing her presence to Raimunda.

Raimunda reveals to Paula that Paco was not her biological father, promising to tell her the whole story later. Agustina is diagnosed with terminal cancer and goes to Madrid for treatment. Raimunda visits her in the hospital. Agustina asks Raimunda if she has seen her mother's ghost. Agustina hopes that the ghost will be able to tell her about her own mother, who disappeared three years before. Raimunda leaves Paula with Sole, rents a van and transports the freezer to a convenient spot by the river Júcar. While staying in Sole's apartment, Paula meets her grandmother's ghost and grows close to her. The next night, Agustina comes to the restaurant, and reveals two startling secrets: her mother and Raimunda's father were having an affair, and her mother disappeared on the same day that Raimunda's parents died.

Sole reveals to Raimunda that she has seen their mother's ghost, who is in the next room with Paula. Irene admits that she did not, in fact, die in the fire, and reveals the whole truth. The reason for Raimunda and Irene's estrangement is that Raimunda's father sexually abused her, resulting in the birth of Paula; thus, Paula is Raimunda's daughter and her sister. Irene tells Raimunda that she did not know about the abuse until Aunt Paula told her about it, and never forgave herself for not noticing it.

Irene explains that she found her husband in bed with another woman and started the fire that killed them both. The ashes that had been presumed to be Irene's were, in fact, the ashes of Agustina's mother, the woman with whom Irene's husband was having an affair. After the fire, Irene wandered for several days in the countryside, until she decided that she wanted to turn herself in. But first, she wanted to say goodbye to Aunt Paula, who had lost the ability to look after herself and with whom Irene had been living prior to setting the fire. Paula welcomed Irene home as if nothing had happened, and Irene stayed, caring for her sister and expecting that the police would come soon to arrest her. Due to the superstitious and closed nature of the community, however, the police never came and the residents, accustomed to tales of the dead returning, explained the rare sightings of Irene as a ghost.

The family reunites at Aunt Paula's house. Irene reveals her presence to Agustina, who believes her to be a ghost. Irene pledges to stay in the village and care for Agustina as her cancer worsens, saying to Raimunda that it was the least that she could do after killing Agustina's mother. Raimunda visits her mother at Agustina's house, and the two embrace and promise to repair their relationship.

Cast

 Penélope Cruz as Raimunda, a mother living in Madrid's suburbs
 Carmen Maura as Irene Trujillo, the mother of Raimunda and Sole
 Yohana Cobo as Paula
 Blanca Portillo as Agustina
 Lola Dueñas as Soledad ("Sole")
 Chus Lampreave as Aunt Paula
 Antonio de la Torre as Paco
 María Isabel Díaz as Regina
 Carlos Blanco as Emilio
 Neus Sanz as Inés
 Leandro Rivera as Auxiliar Producción
 Yolanda Ramos as Presentadora TV

Production

Origins
Volver was first developed by Pedro Almodóvar, based on a story actress Marisa Paredes told him during the production of their 1995 film The Flower of My Secret, another film set in the La Mancha region. The story revolved around a heartbroken Puerto Rican man who opts to kill his mother-in-law in hopes of reuniting with his beloved wife, who left him and broke off contact, at her mother's funeral. Owning a restaurant, he leaves it in his neighbour's care, when he is about to kill his victim. Fascinated by the story and its background, Almodóvar decided on incorporating elements of it into the screenplay of The Flower of My Secret, making it the plot of a movie-within-the-movie based on the main character's novel in the film. While working on the script for Volver, he would however settle on outlining the role of the neighbour Raimunda, as the film's central character, while Emilio, the Puerto Rican, eventually became a supporting role only.

Almodóvar says of the story that "it is precisely about death...More than about death itself, the screenplay talks about the rich culture that surrounds death in the region of La Mancha, where I was born. It is about the way (not tragic at all) in which various female characters, of different generations, deal with this culture".

Casting
Penélope Cruz was the first reported to have landed one of the starring roles in Volver, having previously worked with Almodóvar on his films Live Flesh (1997) and All About My Mother (1999). In preparing for her role, the actress watched Italian neorealism films from the 1950s, many of them starring Sophia Loren and Claudia Cardinale, to study "the Italian maggiorate" that Almodóvar envisioned for her performance in the film. Cruz, who had to wear a prosthetic bottom while filming, noted the role of Raimunda as "the best gift an actress can get".

Carmen Maura, the star of Almodóvar's debut Pepi, Luci, Bom (1980) and five additional films with the director, was the first to be cast in the film alongside Cruz. Her engagement marked her first collaboration with Almodóvar after a period of 18 years and a reported fallout during the production of Women on the Verge of a Nervous Breakdown (1989). Maura commented on the "borderline character" of Irene as a "very complicated [role to play]".

Filming 
Shooting locations included Almagro.

Music
The tango "Volver" by Carlos Gardel with lyrics by Alfredo Le Pera is converted to flamenco and is sung in the movie with the voice of Estrella Morente and lip synced by Penélope Cruz. The dance tune playing at the party prior to Raimunda's lip syncing is called "Good Thing" by the British three-piece indie-dance combo Saint Etienne.

Reception

Box office
In the US alone, the film had made $12,897,993 (15.4% of the total) at the box office after 26.4 weeks of release in 689 theatres. The box office figure from the rest of the world is somewhere in the region of $71,123,059 (84.6% of the total) according to Box Office Mojo. The total worldwide gross is estimated at $84,021,052.

As of 22 January 2007 the film had grossed $12,241,181 at the Spanish box office.

Critical reception
Fotogramas, Spain's top film magazine, gave it a five-star rating. Upon its U.S. release, A. O. Scott made it an "NYT Critics' Pick" and wrote:
To relate the details of the narrative—death, cancer, betrayal, parental abandonment, more death—would create an impression of dreariness and woe. But nothing could be further from the spirit of Volver which is buoyant without being flip, and consoling without ever becoming maudlin. Mr. Almodóvar acknowledges misfortune—and takes it seriously—from a perspective that is essentially comic. Very few filmmakers have managed to smile so convincingly in the face of misery and fatality: Jean Renoir and Billy Wilder come immediately to mind, and Mr. Almodóvar, if he is not yet their equal, surely belongs in their company. Volver is often dazzling in its artifice—José Luis Alcaine's ripe cinematography, Alberto Iglesias's suave, heart-tugging score— but it is never false. It draws you in, invites you to linger and makes you eager to return.

Roger Ebert gave it his highest rating of four stars, calling it "enchanting, gentle, transgressive" and notes "Almodovar is above all a director who loves women—young, old, professional, amateur, mothers, daughters, granddaughters, dead, alive. Here his cheerful plot combines life after death with the concealment of murder, success in the restaurant business, the launching of daughters and with completely serendipitous solutions to (almost) everyone's problems".

As of 2020, the film has a "Certified Fresh" rating from critics at Rotten Tomatoes, scoring a 91% based on 157 "Certified fresh" reviews out of 172 critics, and an average rating of 7.81/10, with the general consensus being "Volver catches director Pedro Almodóvar and star Penélope Cruz at the peak of their respective powers, in service of a layered, thought-provoking film". It also has a score of 84 out of 100 on Metacritic, based on 38 critics, indicating "universal acclaim".

Top ten lists
The film appeared on many critics' top ten lists of the best films of 2006.

 2nd – Marjorie Baumgarten, The Austin Chronicle
 3rd – Glenn Kenny, Premiere
 3rd – Kevin Crust, Los Angeles Times
 3rd – Richard Corliss, Time magazine
 3rd – Philip Martin, Arkansas Democrat-Gazette
 4th – Andrew O'Hehir, Salon
 4th – Peter Travers, Rolling Stone
 4th – Ray Bennett, The Hollywood Reporter
 5th – Desson Thomson, The Washington Post
 6th – Claudia Puig, USA Today
 6th – Scott Tobias, The A.V. Club
 7th – Kenneth Turan, Los Angeles Times
 8th – A. O. Scott, The New York Times
 8th – Keith Phipps, The A.V. Club
 8th – Kirk Honeycutt, The Hollywood Reporter
 8th – Stephen Holden, The New York Times
 9th – Shawn Levy, The Oregonian
 10th – David Ansen, Newsweek
 10th – Lou Lumenick, New York Post
 General top ten
 Carina Chocano, Los Angeles Times
 Carrie Rickey, The Philadelphia Inquirer
 Joe Morgenstern, The Wall Street Journal
 Liam Lacey and Rick Groen, The Globe and Mail

Sight & Sound magazine's critics poll named Volver the 2nd-best film of 2006. In 2019, The Guardian ranked the film 46th in its 100 best films of the 21st century list.

Awards and nominations

Volver received a standing ovation when it was screened as part of the official selection at the 2006 Cannes Film Festival, and won the Best Screenplay award as well as the award for Best Actress — which was shared by the six stars of the film.

|-
| align = "center" rowspan = "14" | 2006 || rowspan = "2" | 59th Cannes Film Festival || Best Actress || Penélope Cruz, Carmen Maura, Lola Dueñas, Blanca Portillo, Yohana Cobo and Chus Lampreave ||  || rowspan = "2" | 
|-
| Best Screenplay || Pedro Almodóvar || 
|-
| rowspan = "6" | 19th European Film Awards || colspan = "2" | Best Film ||  || rowspan = "6" |  
|-
| Best Director || Pedro Almodóvar || 
|-
| Best Screenwriter || Pedro Almodóvar || 
|-
| Best Actress || Penélope Cruz || 
|-
| Best Cinematographer || José Luis Alcaine || 
|-
| Best Composer || Alberto Iglesias || 
|-
| rowspan = "4" | 11th Satellite Awards || colspan = "2" | Best Foreign Language Film ||  || rowspan = "4" | 
|-
| Best Actress – Drama || Penélope Cruz || 
|-
| Best Director || Pedro Almodóvar || 
|-
| Best Screenplay – Original || Pedro Almodóvar || 
|-
| rowspan = "2" | 19th Chicago Film Critics Association Awards || Best Actress || Penélope Cruz || 
|-
| colspan = "2" | Best Foreign Language Film || 
|-
| align = "center" rowspan = "34" | 2007 || 78th National Board of Review Awards || colspan = "2" | Best Foreign Language Film || 
|-
| 7th Vancouver Film Critics Circle Awards || colspan = "2" | Best Foreign Language Film ||  || 
|-
| rowspan = "2" | 64th Golden Globe Awards || Best Actress – Drama || Penélope Cruz ||  || rowspan = "2" | 
|-
| colspan = "2" | Best Foreign Language Film || 
|-
| rowspan = "2" | 12th Critics' Choice Awards || Best Actress  || Penélope Cruz ||  || rowspan = "2" | 
|-
| colspan = "2" | Best Foreign Language Film || 
|-
| 5th Golden Eagle Awards || colspan = "2" | Best Foreign Language Film ||  || 
|-
| rowspan = "14" | 21st Goya Awards || colspan = "2" | Best Film ||  || rowspan = "14" | 
|-
| Best Director || Pedro Almodóvar || 
|-
| Best Original Screenplay || Pedro Almodóvar || 
|-
| Best Actress || Penélope Cruz || 
|-
| Best Original Score || Alberto Iglesias || 
|-
| rowspan = "3" | Best Supporting Actress || Carmen Maura || 
|-
| Lola Dueñas || 
|-
| Blanca Portillo || 
|-
| Best Cinematography || José Luis Alcaine || 
|-
| Best Costume Design || Sabine Daigeler || 
|-
| Best Make-Up and Hairstyles || Massimo Gattabrusi and Ana Lozano || 
|-
| Best Art Direction || Salvador Parra || 
|-
| Best Production Supervision || Toni Novella || 
|-
| Best Sound || || 
|-
| 13th Screen Actors Guild Awards || Best Actress || Penélope Cruz ||  || 
|-
| rowspan = "2" | 60th British Academy Film Awards || Best Actress || Penélope Cruz ||  || rowspan = "2" |
|-
| colspan = "2" | Best Foreign Language Film || 
|-
| rowspan = "5" | 16th Actors and Actresses Union Awards || Best Film Actress in a Leading Role || Penélope Cruz ||  || rowspan = "5" | 
|-
| rowspan = "3" | Best Film Actress in a Secondary Role || Blanca Portillo ||  
|-
| Lola Dueñas || 
|-
| Carmen Maura || 
|-
| Best Film Actress in a Minor Role || Chus Lampreave || 
|-
| 32nd César Awards || colspan = "2" | Best Foreign Film ||  || 
|-
| 79th Academy Awards || Best Actress || Penélope Cruz || 
|-
| 12th Empire Awards || Best Actress || Penélope Cruz || 
|-
| 12th Forqué Awards || colspan = "2" | Best Film ||  || 
|-
| French Syndicate of Cinema Critics Awards || colspan = "2" | Best Foreign Film ||  || 
|}

References

External links
 Audio and Transcript from a 4 August 2006 interview about Volver with Pedro Almodóvar and Penélope Cruz at the National Film Theatre
 
 
 
 
 
 Volver Production Notes from moviegrande.com

2006 films
2006 comedy-drama films
2000s ghost films
Best Film Goya Award winners
Castilla–La Mancha in fiction
European Film Awards winners (films)
Films about dysfunctional families
Films directed by Pedro Almodóvar
Films featuring a Best Actress Goya Award-winning performance
Films featuring a Best Supporting Actress Goya Award-winning performance
Films scored by Alberto Iglesias
Films set in Madrid
Films shot in Madrid
Films about hoaxes
Incest in film
Spanish comedy-drama films
2000s Spanish-language films
Golden Eagle Award (Russia) for Best Foreign Language Film winners
El Deseo films
2000s Spanish films
Films shot in the province of Ciudad Real
Films about sisters